The Scottish Women's Curling Championship is the national women's curling championship for Scotland. The championship usually decides which team of curlers is sent to the World Women's Curling Championship, but in Olympic years, the winner must play the British Olympic representative to play to determine the Scottish team at the Worlds. Beginning in 2021, Scotland's World Championship teams will be selected by Scottish Curling instead.

Past champions

See also
Scottish Men's Curling Championship
Scottish Mixed Curling Championship
Scottish Mixed Doubles Curling Championship
Scottish Junior Curling Championships
Scottish Senior Curling Championships
Scottish Schools Curling Championship
Scottish Wheelchair Curling Championship

References

External links
Scottish Champions Women - Scottish Curling
Royal Caledonian Curling Club - The Columba Cream Scottish Women Champions (web archive, 2007)

1977 establishments in Scotland
Recurring sporting events established in 1977
National curling championships